Princess Amalia of Saxe-Weimar-Eisenach (Amalia Maria da Gloria Augusta; 20 March 1830 – 1 May 1872) was a Dutch princess as the first wife of Prince Henry of the Netherlands, son of king William II of the Netherlands.

Life

Family

She was the daughter of Prince Bernhard of Saxe-Weimar-Eisenach and Princess Ida of Saxe-Meiningen.

Princess of the Netherlands

She first met Henry, alongside his brother Alexander on the island of Madeira in 1847. She married Henry in Weimar on 19 May 1853. They divided their time between Walferdange Castle in Luxembourg, where Henry was stadhouder, and the Soestdijk Palace during the summer.

The marriage remained childless but was described as a happy one, with Amalia acting as the confidante, support and adviser of Henry, and as an intermediary during family conflicts. She may have influenced Henry's defense of the independent position of Luxemburg during the conflict of 1866–1870.

As she had been before her marriage, she had a great interest in charity, which made her popular in Luxemburg. It was thanks to her that kindergartens (initiated by Friedrich Fröbel) were introduced into the area.

On her death in 1872 she was buried in the Nieuwe Kerk at Delft. In 1876 the city of Luxembourg unveiled a statue of her in Henry's presence.

References

Ancestry

1830 births
1872 deaths
House of Saxe-Weimar-Eisenach
Princesses of Saxe-Weimar-Eisenach
Nobility from Ghent
Burials in the Royal Crypt at Nieuwe Kerk, Delft
Dutch princesses